Mihai Mitrofan (9 February 1931 – 23 January 2012) was a Romanian breaststroke swimmer. He competed in the men's 200 meter breaststroke at the 1960 Summer Olympics.

References

External links
 

1931 births
2012 deaths
Romanian male breaststroke swimmers
Olympic swimmers of Romania
Swimmers at the 1960 Summer Olympics
Sportspeople from Bucharest